Ubiquinol-cytochrome c reductase binding protein, also known as UQCRB, Complex III subunit 7, QP-C, or Ubiquinol-cytochrome c reductase complex 14 kDa protein is a protein which in humans is encoded by the UQCRB gene. This gene encodes a subunit of the ubiquinol-cytochrome c oxidoreductase complex, which consists of one mitochondrial-encoded and 10 nuclear-encoded subunits. Mutations in this gene are associated with mitochondrial complex III deficiency. Alternatively spliced transcript variants have been found for this gene. Related pseudogenes have been identified on chromosomes 1, 5 and X.

Structure 
UQCRB is located on the q arm of chromosome 8 in position 22.1, has 18 exons, and spans 8,958 base pairs. The UQCRB gene produces a 5.9 kDa protein composed of 161 amino acids. The gene product of UQCRB is a subunit of the respiratory chain protein Ubiquinol Cytochrome c Reductase (UQCR, Complex III or Cytochrome bc1 complex; E.C. 1.10.2.2), which consists of the products of one mitochondrially encoded gene, MTCYTB (mitochondrial cytochrome b) and ten nuclear genes: UQCRC1, UQCRC2, Cytochrome c1, UQCRFS1 (Rieske protein), UQCRB, "14kDa protein", UQCRH (cyt c1 Hinge protein), Rieske Protein presequence, "cyt. c1 associated protein", and "Rieske-associated protein". After processing, the cleaved leader sequence of the iron-sulfur protein is retained as subunit 9, giving 11 subunits from 10 genes.

Function 

The ubiquinone-binding protein is a nucleus-encoded component of ubiquinol-cytochrome c oxidoreductase (Complex III) in the mitochondrial respiratory chain and plays an important role in electron transfer as a complex of ubiquinone and QP-C. The protein encoded by this gene binds ubiquinone and participates in the transfer of electrons when ubiquinone is bound. It is a target of a protein named natural anti-angiogenic small molecule terpestacin, which enables the role of the ubiquinone-binding protein as cellular oxygen sensors and participants in angiogenesis. This angiogenesis, which is the development of new blood vessels, is hypoxia induced and is facilitated by signaling mediated by mitochondrial ROS (reactive oxygen species). In addition, UQCRB keeps maintenance of complex III.

Clinical significance 
Mutations in UQCRB can result in mitochondrial deficiencies and associated disorders. It is majorly associated with a complex III deficiency, a deficiency in an enzyme complex which catalyzes electron transfer from coenzyme Q to cytochrome c in the mitochondrial respiratory chain. A complex III deficiency can result in a highly variable phenotype depending on which tissues are affected. Most frequent clinical manifestations include progressive exercise intolerance and cardiomyopathy. Occasional multisystem disorders accompanied by exercise intolerance may arise as well, in forms of deafness, mental retardation, retinitis pigmentosa, cataract, growth retardation, and epilepsy. Other phenotypes include mitochondrial encephalomyopathy, mitochondrial myopathy, Leber hereditary optic neuropathy, muscle weakness, myoglobinuria, blood acidosis, renal tubulopathy, and more. Complex III deficiency is known to be rare among mitochondrial diseases.

Interactions 
UQCRB has binary interactions with 3 proteins, including MAGA4, Q1RN33, and 1A1L1. In addition, SDHAF2 has 69 protein-protein interactions, including COX6B1, CYC1, MYO18A, UHRF1, and others.

References

Further reading 

 
 
 
 
 
 
 
 
 
 
 
 

Mitochondrial proteins